There have been two baronetcies created for persons with the surname Frere, one in the Baronetage of England and one in the Baronetage of the United Kingdom. Both creations are extinct.

The Frere Baronetcy, of Water Eaton in the County of Oxford, was created in the Baronetage of England on 22 July 1620 for Edward Frere. The title became extinct on his death in 1629.

The Frere Baronetcy, of Wimbledon in the County of Surrey, was created in the Baronetage of the United Kingdom on 24 May 1876 for the colonial administrator Sir Henry Bartle Frere. The title became extinct on the death of the second Baronet in 1933. The first Baronet was the grandson of John Frere, the great-nephew of Ellenor Fenn and the nephew of John Hookham Frere.

Frere baronets, of Water Eaton (1620)
Sir Edward Frere, 1st Baronet (–1629)

Frere baronets, of Wimbledon (1876)
Sir Henry Bartle Edward Frere, 1st Baronet (1815–1884)
Sir Bartle Compton Arthur Frere, 2nd Baronet (1854–1933)

References

Extinct baronetcies in the Baronetage of England
Extinct baronetcies in the Baronetage of the United Kingdom
baronets